(real name ; 27 September 1914 – 9 January 1988) was a Japanese actor.

Personal life
He is the father of musician Akira Terao.

Filmography

Honours
Medal with Purple Ribbon (1981)

References

Actors from Fukui Prefecture
1914 births
1988 deaths
20th-century Japanese male actors
Recipients of the Medal with Purple Ribbon